The Black Monday Murders is a monthly comic book series published by Image Comics which debuted in August 2016. Created by writer Jonathan Hickman and artist Tomm Coker, the book combines elements of noir fiction, horror, and mystery.

Plot 
The series takes place in the aftermath of  Black Monday, the stock market crash of 1987. The story concerns a group of elite financiers who have made a blood pact with a god, in exchange for power and wealth. A second narrative strand follows NYPD detective Theodore Dumas, as he unravels the secrets of magic at the heart of the global financial market.

According to Hickman, "This is a book about schools of magic. The only difference being that instead of schools of magic, it's financial institutions. Power is accumulated through wealth. It's about a bunch of guys, a bunch of schools, that gathered together and generated a financial collapse in order to attain power".

Reception 
Reviewing the first issue, IGN's Jesse Schedeen called it "another worthwhile addition to the Jonathan Hickman canon", praising its denseness and tone, while also mentioning that these elements might also make it somewhat unapproachable for first time readers of Hickman's work.

References

External links
 at Image Comics

2016 comics debuts
Comics by Jonathan Hickman
Image Comics titles
Mystery comics
Horror comics